The European Journal of Health Economics is a bimonthly peer-reviewed academic journal covering health economics. It was established in 2000 as Health Economics in Prevention and Care, obtaining its current name in 2001. It is published by Springer Science+Business Media and the editor-in-chief is Johann Matthias Graf von der Schulenburg (Leibniz University Hannover). According to the Journal Citation Reports, the journal has a 2020 impact factor of 3.689.

References

External links

Health economics journals
Springer Science+Business Media academic journals
Publications established in 2000
Bimonthly journals
English-language journals